Thomas Hector Toogood (29 December 1872 – 23 September 1953) was an English cricketer.  Toogood was a right-handed batsman who bowled right-arm slow-medium.  He was born at Clifton, Bristol.

Toogood made his first-class debut for Gloucestershire against Surrey in the 1900 County Championship.  He played infrequently for the county, making seven further first-class appearances, the last of which came against Surrey in the 1914 County Championship.  In his eight first-class appearances for Gloucestershire, Toogood took 16 wickets at an average of 30.50, with best figures of 6/115.  These figures were his only five wicket haul and came against Surrey in his final first-class match in 1914.  A poor batsman, Toogood scored just 30 runs at a batting average of 3.75, with a high score of 12.

He died at Stapleton, Bristol on 23 November 1953.

References

External links
Thomas Toogood at ESPNcricinfo
Thomas Toogood at CricketArchive

1872 births
1953 deaths
Cricketers from Bristol
English cricketers
Gloucestershire cricketers